Major General T. N. De Silva, USP (1939 - ) is a former Sri Lanka Army officer, who was the former General Officer Commanding, 21 Division;, Commandant, Sri Lanka Army Volunteer Force, Brigade Commander Armoured Brigade and Director, National Cadet Corps.

Education
Educated at Royal College, Colombo, Balasuriya joined the army in 1962 after leaving school and revived officer training at the Indian Military Academy. Thereafter he was commissioned in to the 1st Reconnaissance Regiment, Ceylon Armoured Corps in 1963 as a Second Lieutenant. He underwent training at the Royal Armoured Corps Training Centre, took the Armour Officers Advanced Course in India and attended staff college gaining the psc qualification.

Military career
After serving as a Troop Leader in the Ceylon Armoured Corps, he served as Officer Instructor, Aide-de-Camp to the Army Commander, staff officer of the General Staff, Recruiting Officer and Adjutant of the Ceylon Cadet Corps. 

As the Commanding officer he commanded the NCOs' Training wing / Recruit Training school at the Army Training Centre in Diyatalawa and later the Sri Lanka Military Academy. After serving in the Security Forces Headquarters – Jaffna, he became the Commandant of the Infantry Training Centre in Minneriya before returning to Jaffna as Deputy Commander, Security Force Headquarters, Jaffna. During the Insurrection 1987-89 he served as Military Coordinator of the Gampaha District.

Becoming the Director of Armour, he became the Brigade Commander of the Independent Armoured Brigade and later the 21 Brigade and the 33 Brigade. Thereafter he was appointed Director of Personnel Administration at the Army Headquarters, then the commandant, Sri Lanka Army Volunteer Forces and general Officer Commanding, 21 Division. He was the Regimental Commander, Sri Lanka Armoured Corps and later the Director, National Cadet Corps.

General De Silva is a graduate of the Command and Staff College. He was awarded the Uttama Seva Padakkama (USP), the Sri Lanka Armed Services Long Service Medal, the Ceylon Armed Services Long Service Medal, the Purna Bhumi Padakkama.

References

External links

Sri Lankan major generals
Year of birth missing (living people)
Alumni of Royal College, Colombo
Living people
Sinhalese military personnel
Sri Lanka Armoured Corps officers
Directors of the National Cadet Corps